St. Olav's Church is a protestant church in Serampore, West Bengal, India. Also known as St Olave's Danish Church, it was built in the early 19th century, when the area was part of Fredriksnagore – then a small (50 km²) colony of Denmark. The building is now jointly controlled by the Church of North India (CNI) and Serampore College Council.

History 
Locally known as the Danish Church, it was one of the 100 buildings that were constructed by the Danish management between 1755 and 1845, at a time when the town was called Frederiksnagore.

A major restoration project there was rewarded by the 2016 UNESCO Asia Pacific Heritage Awards

Architecture
The entrance has an open portico of twin columns under a broken-base pediment containing the royal monogram of Christian VII, king of Denmark when the church was consecrated. Above the portico is a bell tower that also contains a clock. One of the church bells is inscribed "FREDERICKS VÆRCK ANNO 1804", indicating it originated from a Danish factory.

The church is flat roofed, inside and out. The church is not particularly Scandinavian, but reflects the designs of contemporary churches in British India, in particular those in Calcutta, which were inspired by contemporaneous designs popular in Britain, such as St. Martin-in-the-Fields in London.

Gallery

References

Further reading
 
 
 
 

Churches in West Bengal
Danish India
Church of North India church buildings
Churches completed in 1806
Serampore
Serampore